Langpi Dehangi Rural Bank (LDRB) was an Indian rural bank (RRB).  It was  created on 27 January 1982 under Section 3 (1) of Regional Rural Bank Act 1976. It was created under the aegis of the State Bank of India. The main office of the Bank is situated at Diphu, the district headquarters of Karbi Anglong District.

The bank’s primary area of operation consists of the Karbi Anglong and Dima Hasao districts in the state of Assam. It is the sole independent RRB in those districts. The Bank has a total network of 59 branches:  33 branches in Karbi Anglong District, 16 branches in West Karbi Anglong and 10 branches in Dima Hasao. On 1 April 2019, LDRB was amalgamated with Assam Gramin Vikash Bank and a new entity was formed retaining the same name, Assam Gramin Vikash Bank.

Notes

External links
 

1982 establishments in Assam
Regional rural banks of India
Karbi Anglong district
2019 disestablishments in India
Banks established in 1982
Banks disestablished in 2019
Defunct banks of India